Nodipecten magnificus is a species of bivalve in the family Pectinidae. It is endemic to Ecuador.

References

Pectinidae
Endemic fauna of the Galápagos Islands
Bivalves described in 1835
Taxonomy articles created by Polbot